Djair Baptista Machado known as Djair (or Machado in Hong Kong) (born 24 December 1976) is a former Brazilian footballer.

His given name also misspelled as Dejair.

Biography
Born in Caxias do Sul, Rio Grande do Sul, Djair started his career at Grêmio. In 2000, he left for Juventude and played once in 2000 Copa do Brasil. He played a half season in Portugal for Belenenses in 2001, and left the club in mid of 2001–02 Primeira Liga. In 2003, he left for Israeli side Hapoel Kfar Saba from RS Futebol Clube.

São Raimundo
In 2005, he left for São Raimundo (AM), signed a contract until the end of 2005 Campeonato Amazonense. He extended his contract until September in May, for 2005 Campeonato Brasileiro Série B. He played 19 matches in Série B, only missed round 9 and round 19. After Série B had ended, he was signed by city rival Nacional (AM) for 2005 Campeonato Brasileiro Série C in September, which the team finished as the losing quarter-finalists.

In December 2005, he signed a 1-year deal with Ituano, the league rival (Série B) of São Raimundo. After the end of 2006 Campeonato Paulista, he returned to São Raimundo for 2006 Campeonato Brasileiro Série B in May 2006. He made his debut on 20 May (round 6), however he was injured at that match and missed more than 3 months. He returned to starting line-up on 12 September (round 23) but since then failed to enter starting line-up. The team finished as the second from the bottom and relegated.

Porto Alegre & Sampaio Corrêa
In February 2007 he returned to Rio Grande do Sul, signed a contract with Porto Alegre Futebol Clube until the end of Campeonato Gaúcho Segunda Divisão .

In August, he left for Sampaio Corrêa, for 2007 Campeonato Brasileiro Série C second stage. The team finished as the third of Group 17 (there was 8 groups in 2nd stage, namely Group 17 to 24 with a total of 32 teams), failed to enter round of 16 (third stage).

Eastern
In September 2007 he left for Hong Kong First Division League club Eastern. Under Brazilian coach Casemiro Mior, he won Hong Kong Senior Shield with team.

Despite Eastern released Mior and several foreigner due to financial decision at the end of season, Djair was offered a new deal, along with Picoli. He played for the club at 2009 AFC Cup (finished as losing side in group stage) and was selected to Hong Kong League Selection for 2009 Lunar New Year Cup, which losing to united team of South China–Pegasus and Suwon Bluewings (after penalty shootout). Eastern finished as the 9th (out of 13 teams).

Djair returned to Brazil after Eastern withdrew from the top division in 2009 and applied to play in 2009–10 Third Division "A", the non-professional league.

Late career
In December 2009 he returned to Rio Grande do Sul. He signed a contract until the end of 2010 Campeonato Gaúcho with Internacional de Santa Maria. In June 2010 he signed a 1-year deal with Campeonato Gaúcho Segunda Divisão club Cerâmica. He finished as the runner-up at 2010 Copa FGF.

Honours
National
Copa do Brasil: 1997
Hong Kong Senior Shield: 2008
Regional
Recopa Sul-Brasileira: 2010

References

External links
 Futpedia Brazilian League stats. 
  Portuguese League stats. 
 

1976 births
Living people
Brazilian footballers
Primeira Liga players
Machado, Djair Baptista
Grêmio Foot-Ball Porto Alegrense players
Esporte Clube Juventude players
São Raimundo Esporte Clube footballers
Rio Branco Football Club players
C.F. Os Belenenses players
Hapoel Kfar Saba F.C. players
Nacional Futebol Clube players
Ituano FC players
Porto Alegre Futebol Clube players
Sampaio Corrêa Futebol Clube players
Machado
Cerâmica Atlético Clube players
Association football central defenders
Brazilian expatriate footballers
Expatriate footballers in Portugal
Expatriate footballers in Israel
Machado, Djair Baptista
Brazilian expatriate sportspeople in Portugal
Brazilian expatriate sportspeople in Israel
Machado, Djair Baptista
People from Caxias do Sul
Hong Kong League XI representative players
Sportspeople from Rio Grande do Sul